Camanongue is a town, with a population of 12,930 (2014 census), and a municipality in the Moxico province in eastern Angola. The municipality has a population of 34,167 (2014 census) and a total area of 3,046 km.

References 

Populated places in Moxico Province
Municipalities of Angola